Ben Ahmed Attoumani (born 15 September 1982) is a Comorian former footballer who is last known to have played for Noisy-Le-Grand FC.

Career

Seeking a return to Paris as well as finding a higher level of play, Attoumani signed for US Sénart-Moissy in summer 2009, adapting well into his new team.

The former captain of the Comoros national team, Attoumani has been likened to Brazilian left-back Roberto Carlos for his performances during a 2013 Africa Cup of Nations qualifier versus Mozambique.

In 2009, the Comorian defender was enamored of Brazilians Douglas Maicon and Dani Alves due to their defending ability.

References

External links 
 at Footballdatabase.eu
 at National-Football-Teams

Comoros international footballers
Association football defenders
Expatriate footballers in France
Villemomble Sports players
Comorian footballers
1982 births
Comorian expatriate footballers
Living people